Martin D. Dawson FInstP FOSA FIEEE FRSE FRS (born 1960) is a British professor of photonics who is research director of the Institute of Photonics at the University of Strathclyde and is Head of Fraunhofer Centre for Applied Photonics. He has made pioneering contributions in several applied photonics areas.

Career
Dawson is a physicist known for his work on lasers, microLEDs and compound semiconductors. He is Director of Research in the University of Strathclyde's Institute of Photonics, which he helped establish in 1996, and he was also appointed inaugural Head of the Fraunhofer Centre for Applied Photonics in 2012. Martin has over 30 years’ experience of applied research gained in academia and industry in the UK and USA and he has been involved in the formation and technical development of a number of spin-out businesses, most recently mLED Ltd.

Dawson is a pioneer in vertical external-cavity surface-emitting lasers.(VECSELS). He has developed optically pumped VECSELS since 1997 and has achieved a number of world firsts in this field, for example the first tunable single frequency operation of such lasers.

In 1996 he foresaw of the importance of gallium nitride (GaN) micro-LEDs, which are now attracting huge worldwide interest because of their potential for displays. His microLED array work has also established their use as a light source for optogenetics applications and for Li -Fi and visible light communications. Dawson has been a pioneer of this disruptive technology and has published over 90 journal papers on this area alone. His work led to the formation of a University of Strathclyde spin-out company, mLED Ltd, which was sold to Oculus in 2016. He has led the development of GaN micro-LEDs for LiFi since 2010 and his papers have been widely cited. He has a number of world firsts in this field, for example his 2014 paper demonstrating the first application of high-level data encoding techniques to a micro-pixel GaN LED, achieving multi-Gb/s data transmission from the micro-LED.

His advice on useful innovation and quantum technologies has been sought respectively by the UK Parliament's Select Committee for Business, Innovation and Skills and Select Committee for Science and Technology.

Awards and recognition
Dawson was awarded the 2016 Gabor Medal and Prize by the Institute of Physics "for his vision and leadership in applied photonics, including pioneering contributions to optically pumped semiconductor lasers, diamond photonics and gallium nitride optical microsystems, and for fostering the international development and commercialisation of these technologies."

Dawson was awarded the 2016 Aron Kessel Award by the IEEE Photonics Society “for broad and sustained contributions to semiconductor opto-electronic engineering, including optically-pumped semiconductor lasers, diamond photonics and galliumnitride microdevices."

Dawson was awarded the 2021 Nick Holonyak Award by the Optical Society, "For wide-ranging contributions to the development and application of III-V semiconductor devices especially including gallium nitride micro-LEDs and optically-pumped semiconductor lasers" and is the first UK-based recipient of the award.

He became a Fellow of the Institute of Physics in 2000, a Fellow of the OSA in 2006, Fellow of the Royal Society of Edinburgh in 2007, Fellow of IEEE in 2009 and elected a Fellow of the Royal Society in 2022.

In 2021 Dawson was awarded the Nick Holonyak Jr. Award from OSA for "wide-ranging contributions to the development and application of III-V semiconductor devices especially including gallium nitride micro-LEDs and optically-pumped semiconductor lasers"

Dawson was awarded the Global SSL Award of Outstanding Achievements at the International SSL Alliance General Assembly 2021 for his pioneering work in micro-LED technology, with the citation noting "arguably the most imaginative and extensive contributor worldwide to this research field"

References

English physicists
Academics of the University of Strathclyde
Living people
Laser researchers
Fellows of the Royal Society of Edinburgh
1960 births
Fellows of the Royal Society